Carex acutata is a species of sedge, a flowering plant in the family Cyperaceae. It was first formally named by Francis Boott in 1846. Carex acutata is native to South America.

References

acutata
Plants described in 1846
Flora of South America